Steven John William Arnold (born 22 August 1989) is an English professional footballer who plays as a goalkeeper for National League club Southend United.

Arnold signed as an academy scholar at Norwich City's centre of excellence in 2005, following short spells in the youth teams of Boreham Wood and Arsenal. He signed his first professional contract at Norwich in 2007, but was released in May 2008 having not played for the first-team. Arnold signed for Grays Athletic and spent the 2008–09 season there, before joining Conference South club Eastleigh, spending the first half of the 2009–10 season with the club. He signed for Wycombe Wanderers in January 2010. During his time at Wycombe, he was loaned out to Conference Premier team Hayes & Yeading United, and played regularly for the club during the 2011–12 season. He was released by Wycombe in May 2012, having made no first-team appearances.

He signed for League One club Stevenage on a free transfer later that month. After two seasons at Stevenage, where he made 34 appearances, Arnold joined Forest Green Rovers in June 2014. He remained at Forest Green in the National League for two years before spending the 2016–17 season at Dover Athletic. A return to the Football League followed when he signed for Gillingham on League One in August 2017. The second-choice goalkeeper at Gillingham, he left the club in January 2018 in order to sign for Barrow. Arnold then spent the 2018–19 season at Shrewsbury Town before signing for League Two club Northampton Town for an undisclosed fee in June 2019. He helped the club earn promotion in his first season at Northampton, playing in the 2020 EFL League Two play-off Final in June 2020. Arnold signed for National League club Southend United in July 2021.

Career

Early career
After spending time in the youth teams at Boreham Wood and Arsenal, Arnold joined Norwich City's centre of excellence in the summer of 2005. He signed as an academy scholar after playing in a trial match against Rushden & Diamonds' youth team. After playing regularly for Norwich's under-18 team, Arnold trained with the first-team squad and was as an unused substitute in Norwich's 4–2 League Cup victory over Rotherham United on 19 September 2006. After playing for both the club's youth and reserve teams during the 2006–07 season, Arnold signed his first professional contract on 11 May 2007, for one-year with the option of a further year. Arnold made no first-team appearances for the club and was released on 6 May 2008; his release partly due to the form of fellow goalkeepers Declan Rudd and Jed Steer.

Grays Athletic
A month after his release from Norwich, Arnold signed for Conference Premier club Grays Athletic on a one-year contract on 12 June 2008. He made his debut for the club on the opening day of the 2008–09 season, a 3–1 defeat away to Weymouth. Arnold started in the club's first three games of the season, but did not play again until December 2008, keeping the first clean sheet of his career in a 1–0 away victory against Ebbsfleet United on 26 December 2008. He made 18 appearances during the season as Grays finished just above the relegation places. He left the club when his contract expired in June 2009.

Eastleigh
Without a club at the start of the 2009–10 season, Arnold spent a week on trial with Brentford in October 2009, playing 45 minutes in a reserve match against Queens Park Rangers. No transfer materialised at Brentford and he joined Conference South club Eastleigh on non-contract terms on 10 November 2009. Both of Eastleigh's goalkeepers were missing through injury, and as a result, Arnold deputised in a 2–1 away victory at Dorchester Town on the same day as his signing was announced. He made five appearances during his time with the club.

Wycombe Wanderers
Arnold joined Wycombe Wanderers of League One on a six-month contract on 22 January 2010, following a successful two-week trial. He was the club's second-choice goalkeeper during the second half of the 2009–10 season. Arnold signed a one-year contract extension with the club on 21 May 2010. Arnold played regularly for the club's reserve team throughout the 2010–11 season, but failed to make any first-team appearances. He signed another one-year contract extension on 11 May 2011.

Loan to Hayes and Yeading United
Having not played any first-team football at Wycombe, Arnold joined Conference Premier club Hayes & Yeading United on a one-month loan agreement on 5 August 2011, to gain first-team experience. He made his debut in a 3–1 home victory over Alfreton Town on 13 August 2011, saving two first-half penalties during the match. His month at Hayes & Yeading was described as "hugely successful", having played in all six games during the loan agreement, as well as saving a further two penalties. His loan was subsequently extended until the end of the 2011–12 season, and Arnold was ever present for Hayes & Yeading during the first three months of his loan spell. He suffered a fractured metatarsal in Hayes' 3–3 draw against Stockport County on 5 November 2011, and, as a result of the injury, he had to return to his parent club to undergo surgery on his foot. He returned to Hayes & Yeading two months later, and played in their 1–0 away victory against Bath City on 21 February 2012, assisting Michael Thalassitis' goal with his long clearance. Arnold made 31 appearances for the club during the season. At the end of the season, he was voted as the Supporters' Player of the Year. On his return to Wycombe, he was released when his contract expired on 9 May 2012.

Stevenage
Shortly after leaving Wycombe, Arnold signed for League One club Stevenage on a free transfer on 25 May 2012. Stevenage manager Gary Smith stated that goalkeeping coach Gary Phillips had recommended him to sign Arnold, with Phillips working with the player during his time at Grays Athletic. Arnold made his debut for the club in a 3–2 defeat to Dagenham & Redbridge in a Football League Trophy tie on 4 September 2012. He earned the first league start of his Stevenage career in a 2–1 away victory over Notts County at Meadow Lane on 2 October, before keeping his first clean sheet of the season four days later in a 1–0 home win against Scunthorpe United. He signed a two-year contract extension, keeping him at the club until the summer of 2015. He made 32 appearances in all competitions during his first season with the club. He was the club's second-choice goalkeeper, behind Chris Day, during the 2013–14 season and made two appearances that season. Arnold was released by Stevenage on 17 May 2014.

Forest Green Rovers
On 6 June 2014, he joined Forest Green Rovers. He made his debut for the club on 21 February 2015, keeping a clean sheet in a 3–0 win over AFC Telford United. He followed that performance with a second clean sheet in his next match three days later on 24 February 2015 in a 0–0 draw at the Racecourse Ground against Wrexham. At the end of the 2014–15 season he helped Forest Green to the Conference Premier play-offs only to be denied a place in the play-off final after a semi-final defeat against Bristol Rovers.

His first appearance of the 2015–16 season came in the 2–1 FA Cup victory over Football League side AFC Wimbledon on 7 November 2015. He helped Forest Green to the 2015–16 National League play-off final on 15 May 2016 at Wembley Stadium, only to be denied promotion to the Football League following a 3–1 loss against Grimsby Town. The next day on 16 May 2016 it was confirmed he had been offered a new contract by the club. However, on 3 June 2016 the club announced they have released him.

Dover Athletic
After appearing in a pre-season friendly against Leyton Orient on 16 July 2016, it was announced that Arnold had joined Dover Athletic. He made his debut for Dover on the opening day of the 2016–17 season, keeping a clean sheet in a 0–0 away draw against Wrexham.

Gillingham
On 17 August 2017, Arnold signed for Gillingham on a one-year deal after his release from Dover at the end of the 2016–17 season.

Barrow
Unable to regularly break into the Gillingham first-team, he signed for Barrow on an 18-month deal after mutually terminating the contract with The Gills on 16 January 2018.

Shrewsbury Town
Arnold joined League One club Shrewsbury Town on 19 July 2018 on a free transfer, signing a two-year contract.

Northampton Town
Arnold signed for League Two club Northampton Town on a two-year contract for an undisclosed fee on 5 June 2019. At the end of the curtailed 2019–20 season due to the COVID-19 pandemic, Arnold helped Northampton Town gain promotion to League One with a League Two play-off final 4–0 victory over Exeter City in a behind closed doors match at Wembley Stadium.

Southend United
On 2 July 2021, Arnold signed for National League side Southend United. On 15 May 2022, he was voted the club's player of the season.

Career statistics

Honours
Northampton Town
EFL League Two play-offs: 2020

Individual
Hayes & Yeading United Player of the Year: 2011–12
Southend United Player of the Year: 2021–22

References

External links

1989 births
Living people
People from Welwyn Hatfield (district)
Footballers from Hertfordshire
English footballers
England semi-pro international footballers
Association football goalkeepers
Norwich City F.C. players
Grays Athletic F.C. players
Eastleigh F.C. players
Wycombe Wanderers F.C. players
Hayes & Yeading United F.C. players
Stevenage F.C. players
Forest Green Rovers F.C. players
Dover Athletic F.C. players
Gillingham F.C. players
Barrow A.F.C. players
Shrewsbury Town F.C. players
Northampton Town F.C. players
Southend United F.C. players
English Football League players
National League (English football) players